Krieps is a surname. Notable people with the surname include: 

Alex Krieps (born 1946), Luxembourgish politician
Émile Krieps (1920–1998), Luxembourgish resistance leader, soldier, and politician
Robert Krieps (1922–1990), Luxembourgish politician
Vicky Krieps (born 1983), Luxembourgish actress